A Shi'ite Anthology was written by Allameh Tabatabaei and translated by William Chittick, State University of New York Press. 1981.  
Created by the Prophet Muhammad and his twelve Imams, the Hadith is an ancient and profoundly influential body of religious texts in Shia Muslim literature, second in importance only to the Koran itself.

Texts on the practical aspects of life and pure metaphysics are included in this first English translations of excerpts from the Hadith. Especially selected for the Western reader by the renowned Islamic scholar Tabataba'i, the passages from the hadith shed light on the culture, history, law, and theology of the Shi'ite community and provide direct translations of some of the most famous of Islamic prayers.
"This volume is particularly pertinent at the present moment, when volcanic eruptions and powerful waves of a political nature associated with the name of Islam in general and Shi'ism in particular have made an authentic knowledge of things Islamic imperative, lest ignorance destroy the very foundations of human society and the relations which make discourse between various nations and religious communities possible."—Seyyed Hossein Nasr

Allamah Sayyed Muhammad Husayn Tabataba'i is the author of many studies in Islamic philosophy. His book Shia Islam, edited by Seyyed Hossein Nasr, was also published by the State University of New York Press.

Shia literature